Johann Dietenberger (c. 1475 – September 4, 1537) was a German Catholic Scholastic theologian.

Education
Born at Frankfurt-am-Main, he was educated in his native city, and joined the Dominican Order. On 3 June 1511, he registered at Cologne as a theological student; three years later, 23 September 1514, he was admitted to the licentiate, and the next year, after some time spent at Heidelberg and Mainz, received the doctor's degree.

Ordination
Towards the end of 1517 Dietenberger was appointed Regens studiorum and interpreter of Thomas Aquinas at Trier, where he opened his lectures on 27 January 1518. In the meantime he had been elected (1516) prior of his convent at Frankfurt, and he retained this office until 1526, when he became prior at Koblenz.

In 1530 Dietenberger attended the Diet of Augsburg and was chosen a member of the committee of twenty Catholic theologians selected at the meeting of 27 June and presided over by Johann Eck, to draw up a refutation of the Protestant Confession. About the same time he received the appointment of general inquisitor for the Dioceses of Mainz and Cologne. His last years, from 1532, were devoted to teaching theology and exegesis in the Academy of Mainz.

He died at Mainz.

Works
His catechism was: 
Evangelischer Bericht und Christliche Unterweisung der furnehmlichsten Stuck des waren heyligen Christlichen Glaubens, published first at Mainz in 1537 and often re-edited, lastly by Christoph Moufang (Die Mainzer Katechismen).

Dietenberger's German Bible translation: 
Biblia beider Allt und Newen Testamenten, new verdeutscht, published at Mainz in 1534. This work, repeatedly corrected, especially by Kaspar Ulenberg (Cologne, 1630) and the Jesuit theologians of Mainz (1661), was destined to become for the German people Die Katholische Bibel.

He used freely the New Testament of Emser (1527), of whom Martin Luther was wont to say that "he had ploughed with his heifers"; he used likewise other translations compiled in pre-Reformation times, and so did Luther. He was well acquainted with the versions of Luther and of Leo Jud, and used them to improve his own.

Dietenberger composed fifteen polemical tracts, treating various subjects then much mooted: Mass, confession, vows, faith, etc.

References

Attribution

1475 births
1537 deaths
Clergy from Frankfurt
16th-century German Catholic theologians
German Dominicans
Translators of the Bible into German
German male non-fiction writers
16th-century German male writers